The Serpae tetra (Hyphessobrycon eques), also known as the Red Minor tetra, Jewel tetra or Callistus tetra, is a species of tetra, a tropical freshwater fish of the characin family (family Characidae) of order Characiformes.  It is native to the Amazon River drainage in Brazil, Peru, Paraguay, Bolivia and northern Argentina. The fish can be found in slow moving or still backwater including, ponds, small lakes, and streams. In the wild, it forms aggregations around vegetation and tree roots, and thrives when the water temperature is 22-27 °C (72-82 °F).

Serpae tetra can grow to be 5 cm (2 in). They have very distinctive coloring with a red body and a black spot near their gills. It is an omnivore and will feed on flake and blood worms.

In the aquarium

Serpae tetras prefer water temperatures ranging from 72–79 °F (22–26 °C). They will generally do better and show off their best colors in soft, neutral to slightly acidic water. As with any other schooling fish, they thrive in large groups and should be kept in schools of at least six fish. The tank should be well-planted, providing shelter and hiding spots.

Common to these fish is a 'sputtering' or 'twitching' style of swimming, in which their movements seem more spastic as opposed to other fish.  Instead of swimming smoothly or for long distances at a time, Serpae Tetras move in relatively short spurts, unless stressed.  This is their normal behavior and by itself need not alarm aquarists.

If any aggression is seen in the fish, it is usually among conspecifics, especially if they are kept in large groups where they can establish a pecking order (a behavior similar to Puntius tetrazona).

Breeding
Breeding, as with most other tetras, can be difficult due to the few obvious differences between the genders. However, males are usually slimmer and smaller than females. Also, a visible difference in the shape of the swim bladder can be seen above and behind the silverish abdominal cavity. To breed these fish, they should be given a small, dedicated breeding tank planted with thick bunches of fine-leaved plants such as Myriophyllum on which they can lay eggs. Filtering through peat moss can also be helpful. The eggs hatch in about 2 days.

The average lifespan for a serpae tetra is about seven years.

See also
List of freshwater aquarium fish species

References

External links

Tetras
Fish described in 1882
Taxa named by Franz Steindachner